Chedric Seedorf (born 20 April 1983 in Naarden) is a former Dutch footballer who played as a midfielder.

Club career
Like his brothers Clarence and Jürgen and his cousin Stefano he is the product of the Ajax youth academy, but in 1999 his father and player agent Johan Seedorf forced a breach with the club due to irreconcilable differences with then technical director Hans Westerhof. Chedric was admitted to the cantera of Real Madrid, but when Clarence left Madrid for Inter Milan in 2000, Jurgen (briefly) and Chedric went with him.

Realizing that it would be difficult to break through into the senior squad of Inter, Jurgen (De Graafschap) and a little later Chedric would soon opt for a move back to the Netherlands with Eredivisie side NAC Breda. He made his debut in 2001, but did not manage to become a permanent fixture in the squad. His contract was therefore cancelled in 2003, after which he played amateur football for some time.

In August 2005 Chedric signed a contract with Italian Serie C2/A outfit A.C. Legnano, a club presided over by former A.C. Milan star, Marco Simone, a personal friend of Chedric. He also played for Serie C1/A club A.S. Pizzighettone. In June 2007, Seedorf signed for the Belgian coast team K.V. Oostende.

In August 2008, Chedric was loaned to Savoie 74 by A.C. Milan in 2-year contract. That deal ended in January 2009, after which he joined HFC Haarlem.

In July 2009 he was sold to Monza.

Personal life
Chedric is the younger brother of Clarence Seedorf, and also the cousin of Stefano Seedorf.

References

External links
 Dutch Playsers Profile

1983 births
Living people
People from Naarden
Dutch sportspeople of Surinamese descent
Association football midfielders
Dutch footballers
Netherlands under-21 international footballers
Eredivisie players
Eerste Divisie players
AFC Ajax players
NAC Breda players
A.C. Legnano players
A.S. Pizzighettone players
A.C. Milan players
HFC Haarlem players
A.C. Monza players
K.V. Oostende players
Expatriate footballers in Italy
Expatriate footballers in Belgium
Dutch expatriate footballers
Dutch expatriate sportspeople in Italy
Chedric
Footballers from North Holland